The Ministry of War or , sometimes called Tsuwamono no Tsukasa, was a division of the eighth century Japanese government of the Imperial Court in Kyoto, instituted in the Asuka period and formalized during the Heian period.  The Ministry was replaced in the Meiji period.

Overview
This important court officer was responsible for directing all military matters; and after the beginning in the late 12th century, this military man would have been empowered to work with the shogunate on the emperor's behalf.

The ambit of the Ministry's activities encompasses, for example:
 oversight of the rosters of military officers, including examinations, appointment, ranks, etc.
 dispatching of troops
 supervision of arsenals of weapons, guards, fortifications and signal fires
 maintenance of pastures, military horses, and public and private horses and cattle
 administration of postal stations
 control of the manufacture of weapons and weapon-makers
 oversight of drumming and in flute playing 
 control of public and private means of water transportation
 regulation of the training of hawks and dogs.

History
The ministry was established as part of the Taika Reforms and Ritsuryō laws which were initiated in the Asuka period and formalized during the Heian period.  After 702, the Hyōbu-shō replaced the Hyōseikan, which was created in 683.

In the Edo period, titles associated with the ministry became ceremonial titles.

In the Meiji period, the hyōbu-shō was reorganized into a modern Ministry of War and Ministry of the Navy.

Hierarchy
The Asuka-, Nara-  and Heian-period Imperial court hierarchy encompassed a ministry dealing with military affairs.

In the 18th century, the top ritsuryō officials within this ministry structure were:

 , usually a son or a close relative of the Emperor.
 .
 .
 .
 , two positions.
 , considered a very low rank.
 .
 .

See also
 Daijō-kan
 Imperial Japanese Army (1871–1945)
 Imperial Japanese Navy (1871–1945)
 Japan Self-Defense Forces (1954–)

Notes

References
 Kawakami, Karl Kiyoshi. (1903). The Political Ideas of the Modern Japan.  Iowa City, Iowa: University of Iowa Press. OCLC 466275784.   Internet Archive, full text
 Nussbaum, Louis Frédéric and Käthe Roth. (2005). Japan Encyclopedia. Cambridge: Harvard University Press. ; OCLC 48943301
 Titsingh, Isaac. (1834). Nihon Odai Ichiran; ou,  Annales des empereurs du Japon.  Paris: Royal Asiatic Society, Oriental Translation Fund of Great Britain and Ireland.  OCLC 5850691
 Varley, H. Paul. (1980).  Jinnō Shōtōki: A Chronicle of Gods and Sovereigns. New York: Columbia University Press. ;  OCLC 59145842

Further reading
 Friday, Karl F. (1992). Hired Swords: the Rise of Private Warrior Power in Early Japan. Stanford: Stanford University Press. ;  

Japan
Military
Government of feudal Japan
Meiji Restoration
Military history of feudal Japan